Cucchiara is an Italian surname which is most prevalent in the region of Sicily and is also to be found among the American, Argentinian, German and French Italian diaspora. Notable people with the surname include:

 Frank Cucchiara (1895–1976), Italian-American mafioso
 Joseph Cucchiara (1889–1966), Italian missionary
 Tony Cucchiara (born 1937), Italian folk singer-songwriter, playwright and composer

References

Italian-language surnames